The Fenton Art Glass Company is a glass manufacturer founded in 1905 by brothers Frank L. Fenton and John W. Fenton.

History
The original factory was in an old glass factory in Martins Ferry, Ohio in 1905. The factory at one time was owned by the former West Virginia Glass Company. At first they painted glass blanks from other glass makers, but started making their own glass when they became unable to buy the materials they needed. They moved across the Ohio River to Williamstown, West Virginia, and built a factory in 1906. The first year for glass production was 1907. In 1908 John Fenton left the company and founded the Millersburg glass company in Millersburg, OH.

Frank Fenton was the designer and decorator. From 1905 to 1920, the designs made there were heavily influenced by two other glass companies: Tiffany and Steuben. But the many different colors were the work of Jacob Rosenthal, a famous glass chemist who is known for developing chocolate and golden agate glass. Towards the end of 1907, the Fenton brothers were the first to introduce carnival glass, which later became a popular collector's item.

During the Great Depression and World War II, Fenton produced practical items (such as mixing bowls and tableware) due to shortages. At the same time, they continued creating new colors. Towards the end of the Great Depression they also produced perfume bottles for the Wrisley Company in 1938. The bottles were made in French opalescent glass with the hobnail pattern.

In 1940, Fenton started selling Hobnail items in French Opalescent, Green Opalescent and Cranberry Opalescent. The Hobnail pattern glass would become the top-selling line and allowed the Fenton company to exist during WWII and to expand after the war.

In the late 1940s, the top three members of Fenton's management died. Frank Fenton and Wilmer C. "Bill" Fenton immediately stepped in and took over the positions of President and Vice President, respectively. Over the next thirty years, they continued to expand Fenton Art Glass, despite a large number of glass factories closing down.

In 1986, George W. Fenton, Frank's son, took over as President of the company.

Maker marks
In 1970, the company added their logo to the bottom of their "Original Formula" Carnival Glass pieces to distinguish them from their older Carnival Glass pieces. By 1974, Fenton was putting their logo on all the pieces they made. Pieces made in the 1980s have the number eight under the letter "n" in the logo, pieces from the 1990s have the number nine and pieces made in the 2000s have a 0 in the same place. From June 1996 to July 1998 Fenton marked preferred seconds sold in their gift shop with a sandblasted solid or hollow star. In August 1998 an F replaced the star.

Another type of mark is found on glass baskets. Where the glass handles of the baskets are attached to the base of the basket a stamp is made. Each handler had a specific pattern to help identify which handler attached the handle. The marks began in the 1950s and were instituted by Frank M. and Bill Fenton.

Item codes
Fenton used a coding system to describe the items it produced. The code used numbers for the pattern and letters for the color. There were also letter codes for any decorations.

Patterns

Some of the patterns used on items produced by Fenton were:

Colors and combinations
Fenton made hundreds of different colors of glass over the time they were open.

Carnival colors The color of carnival glass is the color of the applied treatment not the color of the piece of glass.

Opalescent colors

Crests This color combination consists of glass of a different color added to the rim of a piece.

Marble or slag A type of glass that is opaque and streaked. It is usually a glass pressed in molds rather than being blown.

Overlays Overlays are a type of cased glass. Cased glass is made up of different colors in layers.

Vasa Murrhina is a cased glass, the name means vessel of gems. This type of glass has a long history pre dating Fenton. Frank M. Fenton had glass chemist Charles Goe develop a way to make it since the way it was made was long forgotten. The piece starts out as a ball of glass that is rolled in small pieces of broken glass called frit. Then another layer of crystal was gathered over the frit.

Fenton has an extensive line of MILK GLASS that also is offered in an array of patterns.

Decorations
Fenton had a long history of decorating glass that goes back to its beginnings in 1905. The Fenton Art Glass company started out as a decorating company that purchased blanks from glass manufacturers and placed their own decorations on them. Fenton did not manufacturer glass until 1907 a year after the Williamstown, WV plant was built.

Decorations found on three or more shapes

Closure
On August 9, 2007, Fenton Art Glass sent out a press release stating they would "cease... operations over the next few months."

Their plans involved laying off 25 employees immediately, and in the following weeks, the rest of their workers would be laid off. However, on December 4, 2007, Fenton Art Glass released a press statement, saying that due to an unexpected buying frenzy and internal restructuring, the company would stay open until at least the spring of 2008. In an open letter in August 2008, company president George Fenton said that thanks to the buying frenzy, the company had been able to institute some reforms, and wouldn't be closing in the foreseeable future.

On July 6, 2011, Fenton Art Glass sent out a press release stating they would "wind down production of its collectible and giftware glass products."

According to WTAP TV, "The company cites financial challenges since its restructuring in 2007 and recent developments as factors in its decision to shut down its traditional glassmaking business. Fenton Art Glass says it's exploring the sales of one or more of its product lines."

Fenton ceased "traditional" glassmaking at the Williamstown, WV factory in July 2011. However, the factory remained open as a jewelry making operation, producing handcrafted glass beads and Teardrop earrings. The Fenton Gift Shop, located in the same building, also had a large quantity of glass remaining in their inventory. Visitors to the factory were still able to watch the beadmaking demonstrations and purchase Fenton Art Glass.

In June 2017, Wood County Schools Superintendent John Flint signed an agreement to purchase the land that the former Fenton Glass Factory occupied.  In October 2017, it was announced that demolition of the factory buildings would begin by the end of 2017, and that the new school, to be named the Williamstown-Waverly Elementary School, will occupy the factory's employee and visitor parking areas.  Art glass using the original Fenton mold designs, including the Fenton emblem, continues to be produced at another factory in nearby Ohio, while handcrafted jewelry and hand painted items will continue to be offered at the new Fenton Art Glass Gift Shop at 2242 Williams Highway, Williamstown, WV 26187.

Continuing the glass bead jewelry tradition
In 2015, Fenton's glass bead jewelry business was purchased by John Barton Company of Philadelphia, PA. Today, the company operates a manufacturing and fulfillment center in Philadelphia, producing glass beads for the wholesale and retail markets, as well as selling directly to consumers through an online store.

See also
Fairy lamp

References

External links

Fenton Glass Jewelry - Handmade Beads & Charms for Bracelets and Jewelry
Fenton Art Glass Company's website
The Fenton Art Glass Collectors of America
The National Fenton Glass Society
The Pacific Northwest Fenton Association
Fenton Fanatics Website
Fenton Art Glass History
Fenton Art Glass Company - Basic Summary

Glassmaking companies of the United States
Manufacturing companies based in West Virginia
Wood County, West Virginia